, son of Masaie, was a kugyō or Japanese court noble of the Muromachi period (1336–1573). He held a regent position kampaku from 1493 to 1497 and from 1513 to 1514. Taneie was his son. A daughter of his was a consort of samurai Hōjō Ujitsuna. Another daughter, later known as Keiju-in, was the wife of Ashikaga Yoshiharu and the mother of Ashikaga Yoshiteru and Ashikaga Yoshiaki.

References

Fujiwara clan
Konoe family
1472 births
1544 deaths